Rubus fraternalis is an uncommon North American species of flowering plant in the rose family. It has been found in Québec and in the northeastern United States (Maine, New Hampshire, Vermont, Massachusetts, and Connecticut).

The genetics of Rubus is extremely complex, so that it is difficult to decide on which groups should be recognized as species. There are many rare species with limited ranges such as this. Further study is suggested to clarify the taxonomy. Some studies have suggested that R. fraternalis may have originated as a hybrid between R. allegheniensis and R. flagellaris.

References

fraternalis
Plants described in 1920
Flora of Quebec
Flora of the Northeastern United States
Flora without expected TNC conservation status